South Korea (IOC designation:Korea) participated in the 1994 Asian Games held in Hiroshima, Japan from October 2 to October 16, 1994.

Medal summary

Medal table

Medalists

External links
 List of Korean medalists in 1994 Asian Games (in Korean)

References

Korea, South
1994
Asian Games